August Reinsdorf (1849–1885) was a German anarchist known for his attempted assassination of Kaiser Wilhelm I.

References

Further reading 

 
 

1849 births
1885 deaths
People from Pegau
People from the Kingdom of Saxony
German anarchists
People executed by the German Empire
Executed anarchists
Executed people from Saxony
19th-century executions by Germany
Failed assassins
People executed for attempted murder